Def Con Zero is an album by Cloak-n-Dagga, a group composed of rappers Canibus and Phoenix Orion, released on October 25, 2005 through Head Trauma Records and First Kut Records. The album features K-Solo, Kool G Rap, and Free among others. A DVD with over an hour's worth of material concerning the rappers and the creation of the album is included.

Track listing
"Intro (Black Kobra)" – 1:37
"Def Con Zero" – 3:35
"Majestic Mic Masters" – 4:43
"Close to Me" (featuring Tyrant and Free)– 4:27
"Letter from Head Trauma" (featuring K-Solo and Kool G Rap) – 5:34
"Gold Trigga" (featuring Crystal Celeste Grant)– 3:45
"Gruntin (interlude)" – 2:25
"Don't Hurt Nobody" – 3:35
"Titans" – 5:04
"Never Run" (featuring Zoo Keepa)– 5:08
"Cloakman" – 4:51
"Y'all Can't Ball" – 4:25
"Commandos" – 4:04
"H.T.R." – 4:21
"Livin'" (featuring Chalie Mackmansupreme)– 5:06
"Rhythmatic Jiu Jitsu" – 3:43
"Universal Soldiers" (featuring Power Move and Halo Infinity) – 4:12
"Sit Yo Hot Ass Down" (featuring K-Solo and Michelle Regnier Mezzo Soprano) – 4:49
"Venomous Spit (B.K. Anthem)" – 2:08

Bonus DVD
The bonus DVD contains a variety of material, including a short mix of videos featuring the songs on the album, interviews, a behind-the-scenes look at the making of the album and a photo gallery.

The DVD was produced by Tyler Holt of 4down Productions.

H.T.R. Video Mix
In the Studio / Behind the Scenes
Exclusive Interviews
Venomous Clips
Bonus Tracks: "Sundown" / "High Rollin'"
Photo Gallery

References

2005 albums
Canibus albums